Group E of the 2010 FIFA World Cup began on 14 June and ended on 24 June 2010. The group consisted of the Netherlands, Denmark, Japan and Cameroon. None of these teams have previously met in a World Cup group stage.

Cameroon was the first team to be eliminated in the World Cup, following their 2–1 defeat by Denmark on 19 June 2010.

Standings

 Netherlands advanced to play Slovakia (runner-up of Group F) in the round of 16.
 Japan advanced to play Paraguay (winner of Group F) in the round of 16.

Matches
All times local (UTC+2)

Netherlands vs Denmark

Japan vs Cameroon

The win for Japan was their first World Cup win away from home soil, and it was also the first time Cameroon was defeated in a World Cup opening match.

Netherlands vs Japan
The first clear chance of the game came from midfielder Wesley Sneijder when he shot over the bar from a long-range free-kick. When Japan broke up the Netherlands' passing, midfielder Daisuke Matsui was positive, helping a move that set Yuto Nagatomo up for a shot that he hit wide. The Netherlands became frustrated, as they struggled to incorporate forward Robin van Persie. Towards the end of the first half, Japan had two chances: defender Marcus Tulio Tanaka heading wide and Matsui with a powerful shot at the goalkeeper.

Throughout the second half, Van Persie managed to break free twice. In the 52 minute, as the ball came into the penalty area, the Dutch number 9 moved the ball towards Sneijder, who shot the ball powerfully towards the goal, scoring via a deflection from the goalkeeper, Eiji Kawashima. Substitute Shunsuke Nakamura later managed to make a cross into the six-yard box, which was cleared by Van Persie. Dutch substitute Eljero Elia, managed to set up Ibrahim Afellay with a one-on-one with goalkeeper Kawashima, but Kawashima prevented him from scoring a goal. Soon after this, Yuto Nagatomo went down in the penalty area claiming a penalty, from a challenge by Dutch Nigel de Jong, but the referee turned down his appeals.

The result was the Netherlands' second win in the competition, which meant that they would progress to the knockout stage if they did not lose their last match

Cameroon vs Denmark

Denmark vs Japan
Japan opened the scoring in the 17th minute from a direct free kick taken by Keisuke Honda – only the second goal scored from a free kick in the tournament. Honda, standing to Danish keeper Thomas Sørensen's left, kicked the ball with great force; Sørensen initially moved to his left, and as the ball sailed past the wall, he shifted direction, but could not recover in time to make the save. Japan's second goal came thirteen minutes later, also from a direct free kick, this time by Yasuhito Endō. Standing outside the penalty area directly in front of the Danish goal, he curled the ball around the wall. Sørensen had been standing on the right side of his goal and could not move to his left fast enough. Endō almost scored from yet another free kick early in the second half. This time, Sørensen appeared to have difficulty judging the path of the ball, and was only able to palm it away at the last second, where it caromed off the goalpost.

Denmark needed to win this game in order to advance and increased their attacks accordingly. Late in the second half, Christian Eriksen put his shot over the goal and Søren Larsen hit the goalpost. They were finally able to score in the 82nd minute. When Makoto Hasebe was adjudged to have fouled Daniel Agger inside the penalty area, Denmark were awarded a penalty kick. Jon Dahl Tomasson took the shot, which was saved by Eiji Kawashima; the goalkeeper, however, was unable to control the rebound, which fell to Tomasson, and he was able to put it in the goal. Japan scored their final goal in the 87th minute. Honda dribbled into the penalty area, forcing Sørensen to attempt to block a potential shot, but Honda passed it to substitute Shinji Okazaki, who merely had to put the ball into an empty net.

The victory was Japan's second World Cup tournament victory on foreign soil, and only their second against a European team. Japan finished group play in second place with six points, and advanced to the knockout round for the second time in their history, and the first time on foreign soil. Denmark ended in third with three points. This was the first time Denmark failed to get past the group stage in the World Cup.

Cameroon vs Netherlands

References

Group E
Group
Group
Japan at the 2010 FIFA World Cup
Cameroon at the 2010 FIFA World Cup